The British Empire Party was a minor right-wing party in the United Kingdom.  It was founded in the early 1950s by P. J. Ridout, a former member of the Imperial Fascist League.

In the 1951 general election, the party stood one candidate, Trefor David, in Ogmore, who received 1,643 votes. A former Plaid Cymru member and miner, David gained some supporters amongst local miners but saw his support reduced after a local paper revealed the fascist past of Ridout.

The party gained a brief boost in 1951 when Arnold Leese told his followers to join the group, although ultimately the minor levels of support that Leese commanded made little difference.

References

Political parties established in 1951
Defunct political parties in the United Kingdom
Far-right political parties in the United Kingdom
1951 establishments in the United Kingdom